Edson Abel Jeremias Tchamo , known by his stage name Laylizzy, is a Mozambican, hip-hop recording artist, songwriter and performer who raps in Portuguese and English.

Music career
At the age of 14, Laylizzy joined a music group called 360 Graus, with his friends Hernani da Silva and alongside producer, Ellputo. They founded Sameblood Studios.
 
In 2014, Laylizzy signed to Pan African orientated Geobek Entertainment's record label, Geobek Records. He has since released two singles under the label, "Tha Crew" in July 2015, followed by the single "Hello" featuring AKA which was released on 1 April 2016, charting on iTunes Mozambique as #1 on all genre and #2 on iTunes South Africa Hip-hop chart.

Laylizzy won an award for 'Best Hip Hop Song' at the 2015 Mozambique Music Awards and was the winner of the Newcomers Delight Section in Hip Hop Magazine, HYPE in December 2015.

In March 2016, laylizzy and fellow Mozambican top artists such as G2, Lizha James, Ziqo, Zena Bacar, António Marcos, Cristel, Nelson and Luwi Ace came together to make the 2016 "Vive Agora" campaign song powered by Vodacom Mozambique.
In April 2016, Laylizzy became the first Mozambican artist to get verified on instagram and Facebook.

In Oct 2016, CNN African Voices profiled Laylizzy as Mozambique's influential artist pushing the boundaries of hip hop music across borders and an artist who believes in future of Mozambique. SA Hip-Hop Magazine ranks Laylizzy as one of the top 10 rappers in Africa

Songs

As a lead artist

Geobek records

References

Mozambican hip hop musicians
Living people
Male hip hop musicians
Place of birth missing (living people)
Year of birth missing (living people)